RIOJA-3  was a submarine telecommunications cable system linking the Belgium and the Netherlands across the southern North Sea.

It had landing points in:
Oostduinkerke-Bad, Flanders, Belgium
Egmond aan Zee, Netherlands

It was withdrawn from service on 13 October 2006

References

Sources
 Kingfisher information site
 FreeLibrary article

Submarine communications cables in the North Sea
Belgium–Netherlands relations
Bergen, North Holland
Koksijde
2006 disestablishments in Belgium
2006 disestablishments in the Netherlands